Berta Zdobnická was a female international table tennis player from Czechoslovakia. 

She won a bronze medal at the 1932 World Table Tennis Championships in the women's doubles with Vera Pavlaskova.

See also
 List of table tennis players
 List of World Table Tennis Championships medalists

References

Czechoslovak table tennis players
World Table Tennis Championships medalists